Dark Tourist is a New Zealand documentary series about the phenomenon of dark tourism, presented by journalist David Farrier. The series, which was released by Netflix, has eight episodes.

Due to the COVID-19 pandemic, a second season was not made.

Episodes

Reception 
On Rotten Tomatoes the series has a 70% rating based on reviews from 20 critics.

References

External links
 
 

2018 New Zealand television series debuts
2018 New Zealand television series endings
2010s documentary television series
2010s travel television series
English-language Netflix original programming
Netflix original documentary television series
New Zealand documentary television series
Television productions cancelled due to the COVID-19 pandemic
Cultural tourism